Brachythemis is a genus of dragonflies in the family Libellulidae. They are commonly known as groundlings.

Species
The genus contains the following species:

Taxonomy
The banded groundling is one of Africa's most familiar and abundant dragonflies. It has only recently been identified as being two separate species, B. leucosticta and the new taxon B. impartita.

References

Libellulidae
Taxa named by Friedrich Moritz Brauer
Anisoptera genera
Taxonomy articles created by Polbot